The name Kristy has been used for one tropical cyclone in the Atlantic Ocean, and eight tropical cyclones in the Eastern Pacific Ocean. It was used in the Atlantic once before the modern naming system was instituted in 1979.

Atlantic:
Tropical Storm Kristy (1971)

Eastern Pacific:
Hurricane Kristy (1978)
Hurricane Kristy (1982)
Hurricane Kristy (1988)
Hurricane Kristy (1994)
Tropical Storm Kristy (2000)
Hurricane Kristy (2006)
Tropical Storm Kristy (2012)
Tropical Storm Kristy (2018)

Atlantic hurricane set index articles
Pacific hurricane set index articles